General Kruger, Krüger, or Krueger may refer to:

Friedrich-Wilhelm Krüger (1894–1945), German Army general
Otto Krueger (general) (1891–1976), German Luftwaffe major general
Paul Kruger (1825–1904), South African commandant-general
Walter Krueger (1881–1967), U.S. Army general
Walter Krüger (SS general) (1890–1945), German SS general
Walter Krüger (Wehrmacht general) (1892–1973), German Wehrmacht general